William Joseph Jenkins (18 May 1885 - 23 December 1956) was a Welsh international forward who played club rugby for Canton RFC and Cardiff. He won four caps for Wales ending on the losing side just once.

Personal history
Jenkins was born in Cardiff in 1885. His younger brother Eddie became a football player of note in the association game winning a single cap for Wales in 1925. Outside of rugby Jenkins worked in the building trade.

Rugby career
Jenkins joined Cardiff in the 1909-10 season, but it wasn't until 1912 that he was selected to play for Wales. He turned out on 9 March 1912 against Ireland at the Balmoral Showgrounds, in a match Wales lost 12-5. Two weeks later he played his second game for Wales, this time at Rodney Parade against France. Although Wales won the game, eight members of the Welsh team played their last Five Nations Championship game. Jenkins was one of the seven players to survive this cull and he was chosen to play in two matches the next season in the 1913 Five Nations Championship.

Jenkins was also selected to play for invitational touring team, the Barbarians. He played twice for the Barbarians, a war-time match against the SA Services in 1915 and later against Neath in 1921.

International matches played
Wales
  1912
  1912, 1913
  1913

References

Bibliography
 
 
 
 

Welsh rugby union players
Rugby union flankers
1885 births
1956 deaths
Cardiff RFC players
Barbarian F.C. players
Wales international rugby union players
Rugby union players from Cardiff
Canton RFC players